The 2003–04 Slovak Cup was the 35th season of Slovakia's annual knock-out cup competition and the eleventh since the independence of Slovakia. It began on 26 August 2003 with Round 1 and ended on 8 May 2004 with the Final. The winners of the competition earned a place in the second qualifying round of the UEFA Cup. Matador Púchov were the defending champions.

First round
The match Steel Trans Ličartovce – MFK Ružomberok was played on 26 August 2003 and the thirteen games were played on 2 and 3 September 2003.

|}

Second round
The four games were played on 30 September 2003 and the four games were played on 1 October 2003.

|}

Quarter-finals
The first legs were played on 21 and 22 November 2003. The second legs were played on 28 and 29 November 2003.

|}

Semi-finals
The first legs were played on 7 April 2004. The second legs were played on 21 April 2004.

|}

Final

References

External links
profutbal.sk 
Results on RSSSF

Slovak Cup seasons
Slovak Cup
Cup